Vaupés may refer to:
 Vaupés River
 Vaupés Department of Colombia